On 6 February 2016, a (Ba 1 Ja 7583) passenger bus carrying 5 civilians and 18 Nepalese Armed Forces recruits from the Bidur Army Training Centre on leave in Kathmandu and returning to Trishuli, speeded and veered off course along the Pasang Lhamu highway in Madanpur, Bagmati. At 13:30, the passenger bus fell off the Keurini cliff, below the road, into a ravine. Eleven were killed, including seven soldiers and the driver. Twelve others were injured.

References 

Bus incidents in Nepal
2016 in Nepal
2016 road incidents
February 2016 events in Asia
2016 disasters in Nepal